Oliver Doud Byron (November 14, 1842 – October 22, 1920) was an American stage actor.

Byron was born in Frederick City, Maryland, and first appeared onstage in Baltimore at age 14.  He later appeared in a number of melodramas, including the long running Across the Continent.America's Lost Plays Vol. IV: Davy Crockett and Other Plays, pp. xvii-xviii (2019)

He was married to Kate Crehan (sister of actress Ada Rehan, and their son was actor Arthur Byron.

References

External links

1842 births
1920 deaths
19th-century American male actors
20th-century American male actors